The Chickasaw Mudd Puppies are an American rock band, formed by Brant Slay (vocalist, washboard, harmonica) and Ben Reynolds (vocalist, percussion, electric guitar). The band played a major part of the music of Athens, Georgia, and were protégés of Michael Stipe (R.E.M.).

Career 
The Chickasaw Mudd Puppies recorded two albums, White Dirt (1990) and 8 Track Stomp (1991), working with producers Stipe, Willie Dixon and John Keane.  The band broke up soon after. Reynolds has since played guitar and sang with the band Workhorses of the Entertainment/Recreational Industry  and taught photography  at the Lamar Dodd School of Art at the University of Georgia.

Despite their famous producers, who also backed up the duo in the studio, Chickasaw Mudd Puppies received little popular attention outside of Athens. Their use of traditional and "invented" percussion instruments, including the stomp board (invented), washboard, cowbells, and even cans, combined with the occasional dobro and lap steel guitars, gave their music an Americana sound.

Their reunion after a 20-year hiatus was sparked by recent interests in their music including songs in the films, The Mechanic and Tracing Cowboys. Alan Cowart, drummer of the Jacksonville band, The Beggar Weeds (also Stipe-produced), joined the band in early 2011. The three musicians appeared together at the 2011 SXSW Music Festival in Austin Texas.

Discography

Albums

Promotional singles

References

External links
[ Allmusic]

Rock music groups from Georgia (U.S. state)